Federal Heights may refer to a place in the United States:

Federal Heights, Colorado
Federal Heights, Salt Lake City, Utah